The Garden State Wine Growers Association (GSWGA) is an industry trade association established as an advocate for New Jersey's wine grape growers, providing leadership on research and education programs, public policies, sustainable farming practices and trade policy to enhance the New Jersey wine grape growing business and communities. The association sponsors multiple wine festivals each year. Vintage North Jersey, a subsidiary of the Garden State Wine Growers Association, was founded in 2013. Vintage North Jersey includes ten wineries in northwestern New Jersey, and received a $16,000 tourism grant from the state of New Jersey.

Members
Of New Jersey's 48 wineries, 40 are members of the Garden State Wine Growers Association. The 10 GSWGA wineries that are also members of Vintage North Jersey are marked with "(VNJ)"

Amalthea Cellars
Auburn Road Vineyards
Bellview Winery
Beneduce Vineyards (VNJ)
Brook Hollow Winery (VNJ)
Cape May Winery & Vineyard
Cava Winery and Vineyard (VNJ)
Cedarvale Winery
Chestnut Run Farm
Coda Rossa Winery
Cream Ridge Winery
DiBella Winery
DiMatteo Vineyards
Four JG's Orchards & Vineyards

Four Sisters Winery (VNJ)
Hawk Haven Vineyard & Winery
Heritage Vineyards
Hopewell Valley Vineyards
Jessie Creek Winery
Laurita Winery
Monroeville Vineyard & Winery
Natali Vineyards
Old York Cellars (VNJ)
Peppadew Fresh Vineyards
Plagido's Winery
Renault Winery
Sharrott Winery

Southwind Vineyard & Winery
Summit City Winery
Sylvin Farms Winery
Terhune Orchards (VNJ)
Tomasello Winery
Unionville Vineyards (VNJ)
Valenzano Winery
Ventimiglia Vineyard (VNJ)
Villa Milagro Vineyards (VNJ)
Wagonhouse Winery
Westfall Winery (VNJ)
Willow Creek Winery
Working Dog Winery

See also
Alcohol laws of New Jersey
American wine
Judgment of Princeton
List of wineries, breweries, and distilleries in New Jersey
New Jersey Division of Alcoholic Beverage Control
New Jersey Farm Winery Act
New Jersey Wine Industry Advisory Council
New Jersey wine
Outer Coastal Plain AVA
Warren Hills AVA
Central Delaware Valley AVA

References

External links
 Garden State Wine Growers Association (official website)

New Jersey wine
Agriculture in New Jersey
Tourism in New Jersey